Eugene Creighton Stoddard (November 10, 1927 – January 21, 2019) was an American politician in the state of South Carolina. He served in the South Carolina House of Representatives as a member of the Democratic Party from 1971 to 1998, representing Laurens County, South Carolina. For a number of years he chaired the South Carolina House of Representatives Education and Public Works Committee. He was a farmer and businessman.

References

1927 births
2019 deaths
Democratic Party members of the South Carolina House of Representatives
Farmers from South Carolina
Businesspeople from South Carolina
People from Gray Court, South Carolina